Eupithecia maspalomae is a moth in the family Geometridae. It is found on the Canary Islands.

The wingspan is about 17–18 mm.

Taxonomy
It was previously placed as a synonym of Eupithecia orana.

References

Moths described in 1961
maspalomae
Moths of Africa